Ravera is a surname. Notable people with the surname include:

Camilla Ravera (1889–1988), Italian politician and the first female lifetime senator.
Gina Ravera (born 1966), American actress
Jean Laurent Ravera (born 1979), Monegasque swimmer
Lidia Ravera (born 1951), Italian writer, journalist, essayist and screenwriter
Élodie Ravera-Scaramozzino (born 1995), French rower